Justice Freeman my refer to:

Charles E. Freeman (1933–2020), associate justice of the Supreme Court of Illinois
Franklin Freeman (born 1945), associate justice of the North Carolina Supreme Court
Thomas J. Freeman (1827–1891), associate justice of the Tennessee Supreme Court